Wendell Steavenson is an American journalist, and writer. She was a 2014 Nieman Fellow.

Her work appeared in The New Yorker, Financial Times, Guardian, Prospect magazine, Slate, and Granta.

Works 

 Stories I Stole: A Journey to Georgia, London : Atlantic, 2002. 
 The Weight of a Mustard Seed, New York : Collins Pub. Group, 2009. 
Circling the Square: stories from the Egyptian Revolution. New York, NY : Ecco 2015.  
The Paris Metro New York : W. W. Norton & Company, 2018.

References

External links 

 https://www.unitedagents.co.uk/wendell-steavenson

Living people
Year of birth missing (living people)
American women journalists
Nieman Fellows
21st-century American women